The American green kingfishers are the kingfisher genus Chloroceryle, which are native to tropical Central and South America, with one species extending north to south Texas.

Taxonomy and species
The genus Chloroceryle was introduced in 1848 by the German naturalist Johann Jakob Kaup. Kaup did not specify a type species but Richard Bowdler Sharpe designated the American pygmy kingfisher in 1871. The genus name combines the Ancient Greek khlōros meaning "green" with the genus Ceryle that was introduced by Friedrich Boie in 1828.

The genus contains four species:

The American green kingfishers breed by streams in forests or mangroves, nesting in a long horizontal tunnel made in a river bank.

They have the typical kingfisher shape, with a short tail and long bill. All are plumaged oily green above, and the underpart colour shows an interesting pattern insofar as the smallest and second largest, American pygmy kingfisher and green-and-rufous kingfisher, have rufous underparts, whereas the largest and second smallest, Amazon kingfisher and green kingfisher, have white underparts with only the males also having a rufous breast band.

These birds take crustaceans and fish caught by the usual kingfisher technique of a dive from a perch or brief hover, although the American pygmy kingfisher will hawk at insects in flight.

Evolutionary history
These water kingfishers are descended from a common ancestor which seems to have been closely related to a progenitor of the pied kingfisher (which at that stage had not yet lost the metallic plumage tone), and are similar in plumage and habits (Moyle, 2006). All four have overlapping ranges, and may fish the same waters; however the weight ratio of aenea: americana: inda: amazona is almost exactly 1:2:4:8, which prevents  direct competition for food. The ringed kingfisher, Megaceryle torquata, a more distant relative, also occurs on the same rivers, but is twice as heavy as the Amazon kingfisher.

Genetically, the largest species, C. amazona, is the most distantly related, while the medium-sized (but differently colored) C. americana and C. inda are sister species. The differing coloration therefore does not indicate their evolutionary history, but rather seems to have evolved independently, to underscore the visual distinctness between taxa, thus helping to keep their gene pools separate (see also Competitive exclusion principle).

References

 Fry, K & Fry, H. C. (2000): Kingfishers, Bee-eaters and Rollers.